Litva may refer to:

 The name of Lithuania in Russian, Czech, Croatian, and some other Slavic languages
 Litva, Brest Region, village in Belarus
 Litva, Kursk Oblast, village in Russia
 2577 Litva, Mars-crossing asteroid

See also
Litwa (disambiguation)